VSI may stand for:
Vertical shaft impactor, a type of impact crusher
Vertical speed indicator, an instrument in an aircraft monitoring rate of descent or climb
Very Short Introductions, a series of books published by Oxford University Press
 Virtual Switching Instance, in VPLS
 Voluntary Service International, the Irish branch of Service Civil International
 VMS Software Inc. A vendor/supporter of OpenVMS related software.
VSI Group, British dubbing and translation company
VSI Berlin GmbH, German subsidiary
VSI Translation & Subtitling BV, Dutch subsidiary
Vendor's Single Interest insurance, a type of insurance that only protects the lien holder, as opposed to dual coverage insurance
Voltage Source Inverter, DC to AC converter